This is a list of all species of the genus Schefflera. Most of its species were reassigned to Heptapleurum, Sciodaphyllum, and other genera.

Schefflera balansana 
Schefflera candelabrum 
Schefflera coenosa 
Schefflera digitata 
Schefflera euthytricha 
Schefflera heterophylla of Malaya and Sumatra.
Schefflera kerchoveiana 
Schefflera leratii 
Schefflera neoebudica 
Schefflera ouveana 
Schefflera pseudocandelabrum 
Schefflera samoensis 
Schefflera vieillardii 
Schefflera vitiensis

References

Schefflera